Branch is an unincorporated community in Collin County, located in the U.S. state of Texas.

Geography

Boundary
On June 30, 2011, a Collin County District Court Judge issued a judgment ending a legal dispute over Princeton's southern boundary. The judgment ruled against the city, finding that the tract of land in question had not been annexed and was not lawfully within the city limits. 
The case was filed on January 12, 2010 and was titled: The State of Texas Ex Rel. Collin County, Texas vs. The City of Princeton, Texas, Case No. 401-00108-2010. 
 
The State of Texas' Motion for Summary Judgement stated "that Princeton administration had 'unlawfully and improperly attempted to assert jurisdiction over a tract of land which the city never annexed and which is not lawfully within the corporate city limits,' according to Collin County court records."" "Tract Five, the property in question, is a strip of land that runs the length of the right of way of Farm to Market Road 982 from about a half mile south of U.S. Highway 380 to its intersection with FM Road 546." "The southern portion of this tract was incorporated as part of the city of Branch from August of 1971 through April of 1977." 
"After three months in which no response of any kind was received from the city (of Princeton) in regard to the matter, the (approximately 100) landowners concluded that the city (of Princeton) was ignoring (them) and decided in November (of 2006) to refer the matter to the Collin County District Attorney for possible legal action." The landowners "provided all of the documentation" (to the D.A.)...

"The state's quo warranto motion, filed in November 2010, claimed that Princeton was wrongfully exercising powers not authorized by any law or statute and that a judgment on the case could be made without a trial and instead based solely on Princeton city records."   "Princeton officials first claimed the 5.5-mile strip of land as part of the city limits in 2003, but according to the state's motion, the 'contorted history of Tract Five and the City's current efforts to effectively annex by stealth began in 1971.'"   "In January 1971, the city enacted Ordinance No. 104, through which Princeton attempted to annex certain right-of-ways surrounding the city by a process commonly referred to as 'strip annexation.'"   "Princeton City Council passed a motion to annex five tracts, but in April of that year, the council passed another motion to eliminate Tract Five from the proposed annexations." "Texas Legislature subsequently prohibited 'strip annexation' through procedures mandated by Chapter 43 of the Texas Local Government Code." "All area maps, including one Princeton filed in 2000 with the U.S. Dept. of Justice, show that Tract Five did not belong to Princeton." "Included in the state's original filing on the case in 2010 is a corporate map of Branch that was legally filed in Collin County records in March 1975, showing that Branch owns (sic) the corner of FM 982 and FM 546 and part of the same land Princeton began claiming as its own in 2003."   "Robert Davis, specially deputized District Attorney representing the state, said in the state's motion for summary judgment that 'in 2003, realizing that they were prohibited by law from engaging in the type of strip annexation which was accomplished by Ordinance No. 104, the City passed an ordinance which attempted to refute the fact that the fifth tract of land had been deleted from Ordinance No. 104 prior to final passage.'   "The state initially brought the motion for summary judgment before Judge Mark Rusch of the 401st Judicial District Court..., but the state and Princeton decided to let Wheless rule on the case after Rusch disclosed he was a prosecutor in the Collin county District Attorney's office during a related case in 1990."  On February 25, 2011, Judge Mark Rusch signed the Administrative Order of Assignment, which stated, "...it is my opinion that the most efficient management of this case necessitates it be transferred to the 366th Judicial District Court."  A few days later, the case retained the same name, but was re-numbered to show that it was being decided in the 366th Judicial District Court: Case No. 366-00108-2010.

Using only Princeton's official city records, District Court Judge Ray Wheless ruled: "that Princeton's southern most corporate city limit officially extends to approximately 0.6 miles south of the intersection of F.M. Road 982 with U.S. Highway 380 but does NOT include the 5.5-mile stretch to FM 546."  "The order brings Princeton's south boundary back to where it stood for nearly 32 years."  Princeton's City Council minutes from July 11, 2011 state that "Councilmember Beauchamp made a motion to not appeal the Quo Warranto, Case No. 401-00108-2010.  Councilmember Glass seconded the motion.  The motion carried unanimously."  This decision was reported in The Princeton Herald on July 14, 2011 by Jamie Engle under the title, "City manager terminated, no appeal in 982 case."

References

Unincorporated communities in Collin County, Texas
Unincorporated communities in Texas